Angel Gavrilov (born 24 September 1927) is a Bulgarian former sprinter. He competed in the men's 100 metres at the 1952 Summer Olympics.

References

External links
 

1927 births
Possibly living people
Athletes (track and field) at the 1952 Summer Olympics
Bulgarian male sprinters
Olympic athletes of Bulgaria
Place of birth missing (living people)